Lim Dong-hyun,  (born April 11, 1995) professionally known as Lee Do-hyun, is a South Korean actor. He is best known for his roles in Hotel del Luna (2019), 18 Again (2020),  Sweet Home (2020), Youth of May (2021) and The Glory (2022-2023).

Early life and education 
Lee Do-hyun was born in Seoul, South Korea on April 11, 1995. Lee is the eldest son and has a younger brother, Im Dong-hyuk, who has an intellectual disability. Lee graduated from the Department of Film and Theater at Chung-Ang University.

Career 
Lee Do-hyun made his acting debut in the 2017 black comedy Prison Playbook, in which he portrayed the young version of Jung Kyung-ho's character.

In 2018, Lee was cast in the romantic television series Still 17 in a supporting role as a member of the high school's rowing club. For his performance, he was nominated in the "Character of the Year" category at the 2018 SBS Drama Awards alongside Ahn Hyo-seop and Jo Hyun-sik. The same year, Lee also appeared in Clean with Passion for Now, playing the female lead's younger brother and a promising Taekwondo athlete.

In 2019, Lee joined the cast of the dark fantasy television series Hotel del Luna which became one of the highest-rated Korean dramas in cable television. He also made a special appearance in tvN's The Great Show. Lee starred in Scouting Report, the fifth drama of KBS Drama Special'''s tenth season, for which he won the "Best Actor in a One-Act/Special/Short Drama Award" at the 33rd KBS Drama Awards.

In 2020, Lee had his first lead role in the romantic comedy 18 Again, based on the 2009 American film 17 Again. His performance in the drama earned him the Best New Actor award in television at the 57th Baeksang Arts Awards. and Best New Actor award at the 7th APAN Star Awards. Later that year, he had a starring role in Netflix's Sweet Home, adapted from the webtoon of the same name. He received a good response for portraying a cool-headed and cynical character.

In 2021, Lee appeared in Beyond Evil, where he played younger self of Shin Ha-kyun's character. He also starred in KBS2's Youth of May, a drama set in 1980 during the Gwangju Uprising, earned him a "Next Generation Melo-king" title for his spectacular performance in a melodrama genre. Later in July 2021, Lee was confirmed to join the tvN drama Melancholia with Im Soo-jung, airing in the second half of 2021. At the end of 2021, Lee became the MC of the 2021 KBS Drama Awards with Sung Si-kyung and Kim So-hyun.

In 2022, Lee starred in the web series Reincarnation Romance, a short web series advertising motion sickness pills. This is the third reunion with Go Min-si. In December, Lee returned to the small screen with the Netflix drama written by writer Kim Eun-sook titled The Glory'', with Song Hye-kyo.

Personal life

Military service 
On February 2, 2023, it was reported that Lee would enlist in the military for the first half of the year. Later the agency confirmed that no decision has been made and that if the date of the mandatory military service is received, it will be told for sure.

Filmography

Film

Television series

Web series

Hosting

Awards and nominations

Listicles

References

External links 
 Lee Do-hyun at Yuehua Entertainment 
 
 
 

1995 births
Living people
South Korean male actors
South Korean male television actors
South Korean male web series actors
Chung-Ang University alumni
Best New Actor Paeksang Arts Award (television) winners